Ettayapuram taluk is a taluk of Thoothukudi district of the Indian state of Tamil Nadu. The headquarters of the taluk is the town of Ettayapuram.

Demographics
According to the 2011 census, the taluk of Ettayapuram had a population of 74,985 with 36,415  males and 38,570 females. There were 1059 women for every 1000 men. The taluk had a literacy rate of 70.27. Child population in the age group below 6 was 3,432 Males and 3,332 Females.

References 

Taluks of Thoothukudi district